Half-light: Collected Poems 1965–2016 is a 2017 poetry collection by Frank Bidart. It was published by Farrar, Straus and Giroux on August 15, 2017. Half-light is a comprehensive book of Bidart's poetry, collecting all of his previous collections as well as a new volume, Thirst (2016).

The collection won the 2018 Pulitzer Prize for Poetry. Judges of the prize called the book "a volume of unyielding ambition and remarkable scope that mixes long dramatic poems with short elliptical lyrics, building on classical mythology and reinventing forms of desires that defy societal norms." The collection also won the 2017 National Book Award for Poetry.

Contents
 In the Western Night: Collected Poems 1965–90 (1990)
 In the Western Night (1990)
 The Sacrifice (1983)
 The Book of the Body (1977)
 Golden State (1973)
 The First Hour of the Night (1990)
 Desire (1997)
 Star Dust (2005)
 Watching the Spring Festival (2008)
 Metaphysical Dog (2013)
 Thirst (2016)

Reception
Publishers Weekly called it "an almost overwhelming bounty, a permanent book."

Elizabeth Lund of The Washington Post called it a "monumental work" and praised Bidart's storytelling ability.

Awards and recognition
 2018 Pulitzer Prize for Poetry, winner
 2017 National Book Award for Poetry, winner

Publication history
  736pp.
  736pp.

References

2017 poetry books
American poetry collections
Farrar, Straus and Giroux books
National Book Award for Poetry winning works
Pulitzer Prize for Poetry-winning works